Dunava Parish is an administrative unit of Jēkabpils Municipality, Latvia.

Towns, villages and settlements of Dunava parish

References 

Parishes of Latvia
Jēkabpils Municipality